Are Women People? A Book of Rhymes for Suffrage Times is the title of the collection of satirical poems published on June 12, 1915 by suffragist Alice Duer Miller. Many of the poems in this collection were originally released individually in the New York Tribune.

This collection mainly contains satirical works and poetry designed to promote the suffrage movement. Her collection was broke down into five sections: the Treacherous Texts, Campaign Material, Women's Sphere, A Masque of Teachers, and The Unconscious Suffragists. Each section varied in the style of writing employed by Miller from poetry, to prose, to lists, to a short play, but all of the writings promoted feminist and suffragist themes and ideals.

Summary and Themes

The Treacherous Texts
The first section, the Treacherous Texts, contains satirical poetry that was written in direct response to a quote often from a public official that openly expressed anti-feminist and anti-suffragist ideals. Her poems in this section varied from satirical and comical to biting and harsh critiques of the quotes to which she was responding. She included these quotes above each poem for this section. One prime example of her use of this format was in her poem Representation, wherein which Miller writes in response to a quote by Vice President Thomas R. Marshall:

Representation

("My wife is against suffrage, and that settles me."—Vice-President Marshall.)

I

My wife dislikes the income tax,

And so I cannot pay it;

She thinks that golf all interest lacks,

So now I never play it;

She is opposed to tolls repeal

(Though why I cannot say),

But woman's duty is to feel,

And man's is to obey.

II

I'm in a hard position for a perfect gentleman,

I want to please the ladies, but I don't see how I can,

My present wife's a suffragist, and counts on my support,

But my mother is an anti, of a rather biting sort;

One grandmother is on the fence, the other much opposed,

And my sister lives in Oregon, and thinks the question's closed;

Each one is counting on my vote to represent her view.

Now what should you think proper for a gentleman to do?

Campaign Material (For Both Sides)

This section of the collection mainly contains lists and short timelines relating to suffrage themes. Many of these lists are sarcastic and critical examinations of the anti-suffrage and anti-feminist perspectives. One such list, Why We Oppose Pockets for Women, satirically examines the equal right of women to have pockets as a clear critique of those who pose similar arguments against women's suffrage:

Why We Oppose Pockets for Women

1. Because pockets are not a natural right.

2. Because the great majority of women do not want pockets. If they did they would have them.

3. Because whenever women have had pockets they have not used them.

4. Because women are required to carry enough things as it is, without the additional burden of pockets.

5. Because it would make dissension between husband and wife as to whose pockets were to be filled.

6. Because it would destroy man's chivalry toward woman, if he did not have to carry all her things in his pockets.

7. Because men are men, and women are women. We must not fly in the face of nature.

8. Because pockets have been used by men to carry tobacco, pipes, whiskey flasks, chewing gum and compromising letters. We see no reason to suppose that women would use them more wisely.

Women's Sphere 
This section of the collection contains more of Miller's short poems. These satirical poems directly address issues of feminism, the double standards that women face and the need for equality for women. This collection of poems differs from that of The Treacherous Texts because unlike in the first section, most of the poems in this collection are not directly in response to and referencing a specific quote. One such work that exemplifies the kinds of satirical feminist writings typical of this section is A Sex Difference:

A Sex Difference
When men in Congress come to blows at something someone said,

I always notice that it shows their blood is quick and red;

But if two women disagree, with very little noise,

It proves, and this seems strange to me, that women have no poise.

A Masque of Teachers 

This section contains only one work called The Ideal Candidates. This work is a short one-act play written in verse. The work is set up as a conversation between three candidates to become teachers and the board of education. Each candidate needs to prove to the board of directors that their husband is either unfit to work, or that they were left by their husband in order to be given a teaching position. This was written in response to a by-law of the New York Board of Education. At the beginning of the piece Miller directly addressed the motivation for this satirical work by including:"A by-law of the New York Board of Education says: 'No married woman shall be appointed to any teaching or supervising position in the New York public schools unless her husband is mentally or physically incapacitated to earn a living or has deserted her for a period of not less than one year.'"

The Unconscious Suffragists 

This final section contains quotes from many important male political leaders in the United States. All of the quotes collected in this section, whether or not it was the intention of the author, are arguing in favor of suffrage and equality for women.

Release and Publication 
These poems were originally released individually in the New York Tribune, and were later published as a collection by the George H. Doran company in 1915. In the introduction to this collection, Miller included the dedication:

"To the New York Tribune, in whose generous columns many of these verses first appeared, the author here wishes to express her gratitude."

Her column in the New York Tribune ran from February 1914 to November 1917.

Reception
This collection was positive in its initial critical reception. It appeared in the New York Times' list of "IMPORTANT NEW BOOKS FOR JUNE; Publications in Various Fields of Literature to Fill Demands for Summer Reading," published on June 6, 1915. In the review:
Are Women People? verses and burlesques by Alice Duer Miller, and "How It Feels to be the Husband of a Suffragette- by Him," are two small suffrage books combining serious purpose with frivolous expression, both issued on June 12, just in time for the suffrage campaign now in several States[sic], including New York."

Contents

Treacherous Texts 
 ARE WOMEN PEOPLE?
 Our Idea of Nothing at All
 Lines to Mr. Bowdle of Ohio
 On Not Believing All You Hear
 The Revolt of Mother
 The Gallant Sex
 Representation
 Sonnet
 To President Wilson
 Home and Where It Is
 The Maiden's Vow
 Such Nonsense
 A Suggested Campaign Song
 The Woman of Charm
 A Modern Proposal
 The Newer Lullaby
 The Protected Sex
 Warning to Suffragists
 Partners
 What Governments Say to Women
 "Oh, That 'Twere Possible!"
 The Times Editorials

Campaign Material (For Both Sides)
 Our Own Twelve Anti-suffragist Reasons
 Why We Oppose Pockets for Women
 Fashion Notes: Past and Present
 Why We Oppose Women Travelling in Railway Trains
 Why We Oppose Schools for Children
 But Then Who Cares for Figures
 Why We Oppose Votes for Men
 The Logic of the Law
 Consistency
 Sometimes We're Ivy, and Sometimes We're Oak
 Do You Know
 Interviews With Celebrated Anti-Suffragists
 Another of Those Curious Coincidences
 The New Freedom
 To the Great Dining Out Majority

Women's Sphere 
 Many Men to Any Woman
 A Sex Difference
 Advice to Heroines
 Mutual Vows
 If They Meant All They Said
 Democracy
 Feminism
 The Warning
 Evolution
 Intercepted
 The Universal Answer
 Candor
 What Every Woman Must Not Say
 Chivalry
 Women
 Beware!
 Male Philosophy
 From a Man's Point of View
 Glory
 Dependence
 Playthings
 Militants
 A Lady's Choice
 The Ballad of Lost Causes
 Thoughts at an Anti Meeting

A Masque of Teachers 
 The Ideal Candidates

References

External links
The Project Gutenberg: Are Women People? Full Text
 

1915 poems
Women's suffrage
American poetry collections